Melanie Moore is an American women's basketball coach who is the former head coach at Xavier.

Coaching career

Michigan (asst.)
On May 18, 2018, Moore was promoted to associate head coach of the Michigan women's basketball program under head coach Kim Barnes Arico.

Xavier
On April 5, 2019, Moore was named head coach of the Xavier Women's Basketball program. She replaced Brian Neal who stepped down as head coach of the program at the end of the 2018–19 season.

Personal life
Moore is married to her husband Joe, they have two children, Tristin and Ayla.

Head coaching record

College

References

External links
Xavier profile

Year of birth missing (living people)
Living people
Xavier Musketeers women's basketball coaches
American women's basketball coaches
Female sports coaches
Michigan Wolverines women's basketball coaches
Princeton Tigers women's basketball coaches
Dayton Flyers women's basketball coaches
Indiana State Sycamores women's basketball coaches
Siena Saints women's basketball coaches
People from Putnam County, Ohio
Siena Saints women's basketball players
Basketball coaches from Ohio
Basketball players from Ohio